"Celoron" is a folk song written by Robert Schmertz to describe an expedition in June 1749. A copy of this song is part of the Robert Schmertz collection.

The expedition was led by Captain Celoron de Blainville. He had received instructions from the Comte de la Galissoniere to protect the French trading activities in lands west of the Allegheny Mountains from the British Ohio Company. Celeron led the expedition of Indians and Frenchmen to the St. Lawrence River and Montreal. From there, they traveled to Lake Ontario and the Niagara River. They continued to Lake Erie and to the upper Allegheny River. As they traveled down the Allegheny toward Pittsburgh, they deposited various lead plates that announced that the land belonged to Louis, King of France.

Lyrics

References

American folk songs